Ocean Drive is the debut album by British musical duo Lighthouse Family, released in 1995 on Wildcard / Polydor Records. The album produced the UK top 10 hit "Lifted" (the most-played single on radio nationally during the first quarter of 1996) and UK top 20 hits "Ocean Drive", "Goodbye Heartbreak" and "Loving Every Minute". The album spent 175 weeks on the UK Albums Chart and achieved 6 times Platinum sales of 1.8 million copies. As of 2022, it was the highest-selling debut album in North East England since records began in 1956.

Track listing

Personnel

Musicians

 Tunde Baiyewu  – lead and backing vocals
 Dave Brewis  – guitar
 Rupert Brown  – drums
 Danny Cummings  – percussion
 Steven Dante  – backing vocals
 Simon Eyre  – guitar
 David Grant  – backing vocals
 Lain Gray  – backing vocals
 Tee Green  –  backing vocals
 Clive Griffin  – backing vocals
 Heard But Not Seen  – backing vocals
 Lawrence Johnson  – backing vocals
 Tim Kellett  – flugelhorn, trumpet
 The London Session Orchestra  – strings
 Frank Ricotti  – vibraphone
 Philip Todd  – bass, brass, flute
 Paul Tucker  – keyboards
 Pete Wingfield  – piano
 Gavyn Wright  – violin

Technical

Paul Max Bloom  –	assistant engineer
Phil Bodger  – mixing
Bernie Grundman  – mastering
Martin Hayles  – engineer
Nick Ingman  – string arrangements
Lighthouse Family   – arranger
Mike Peden  – arranger, mixing, producer
Paul Tucker  – keyboards
Norman Watson  – photography
Mel Wesson  – programming

Charts

Weekly charts

Year-end charts

Certifications

References

1995 debut albums
Lighthouse Family albums
Polydor Records albums
Albums produced by Mike Peden